{{DISPLAYTITLE:C15H16O2}}
The molecular formula C15H16O2 (molar mass: 228.29 g/mol, exact mass: 228.1150 u) may refer to:

 Bisphenol A (BPA)
 Nabumetone

Molecular formulas